The RSA Battle House Tower is located in Mobile, Alabama and is Alabama's tallest building. The building is owned by the Retirement Systems of Alabama (RSA). It is the tallest on the Gulf Coast of the United States outside Houston. It replaces the Shipt Tower in Birmingham as the tallest building in Alabama and the RSA–BankTrust Building as the tallest in Mobile. The building is named for the neighboring Battle House Hotel, which is now part of the tower complex. The Battle House Hotel was restored and renovated as part of the tower project.

Construction
The building began with foundation slab concrete being poured during the weekend of 7 November 2003. During construction, five hurricanes affected Mobile, causing delays in the construction of this building: Hurricane Frances and Hurricane Ivan in 2004, as well as Hurricane Cindy, Hurricane Dennis, and Hurricane Katrina in 2005.

Facilities

See also
List of tallest buildings in Mobile
List of tallest buildings in Alabama
List of tallest buildings in the United States

References

External links

Official website
RSA Battle House Tower at Emporis
Photographs of the RSA Tower rooftop

Skyscraper office buildings in Mobile, Alabama
Office buildings completed in 2007
Skyscrapers in Mobile, Alabama
Skyscraper hotels in Alabama
2007 establishments in Alabama